Narmashir (formerly, Rostamabad (Persian: رستم آباد) also romanized as Rostamābād) is a city & capital of Narmashir County, Kerman Province, Iran.  At the 2006 census, its population was 3,966, in 1,007 families.

History 
In the middle ages, Narmashir was one of the major cities of Kerman, but it was not at its present location — the ruins at the nearby village of Choghukabad are the most likely candidate for the site of medieval Narmashir. The medieval geographers al-Muqaddasi, Yaqut al-Hamawi, and Hamdallah Mustawfi described medieval Narmashir as a large and prosperous town on the main trade route connecting Kerman with Sistan. Merchants travelling between Oman and Khorasan did business here, and there was also a market for Indian goods. The town was walled, with four gates and a citadel, and there was a congregational mosque built of fired brick. Narmashir was one of the five kuras (districts) of Kerman during this period. Sometime between Mustawfi's account in the 14th century, Narmashir became abandoned; European travellers in the 19th century found no trace of it.

References

Populated places in Narmashir County

Cities in Kerman Province